Oldenlandia ocellata is a species of plant in the family Rubiaceae. It is endemic to Yemen.  Its natural habitat is rocky areas. Oldenlandia ocellata is in the "vulnerable" category of the conservation list.

References

ocellata
Endemic flora of Socotra
Vulnerable plants
Taxonomy articles created by Polbot